Air Conflicts: Vietnam is a flight simulation video game in the Air Conflicts series developed by Games Farm and published by BitComposer Entertainment. The game was released on November 26, 2013 for PlayStation 3 and Xbox 360, and Microsoft Windows. An Ultimate Edition of the game was released for PlayStation 4 on June 27, 2014. The player must take down the enemy pilots in order to win each level.

Development
The developers aimed to create a game which players could "pick up and play" without requiring a large time investment.

The game was released for PlayStation 3 and Xbox 360 on November 26, 2013. In 2014 the developers announced that an 'Ultimate Edition' of the game would be released exclusively on PlayStation 4 that year, an edition which would include a new campaign and other improvements to the game. This edition was released on June 27, 2014.

Reception

The game has received generally unfavorable reviews.

The game was given an award at Booom Contest for being the best 2013 video game developed in Slovakia.

See also
War Thunder

References

2013 video games
Helicopter video games
Windows games
PlayStation 3 games
PlayStation 4 games
Xbox 360 games
Video games developed in Slovakia
Flight simulation video games
Vietnam War video games
Video games set in Vietnam
BitComposer Interactive games